Teethgrinder was a single released by rock band Therapy?, taken from their album Nurse (1992). It was released on 19 October 1992 through A&M Records. The single reached number 30 in the UK Singles Chart, and number 19 in the Irish Singles Chart.

It was available on 7", limited edition purple vinyl 7", CD, CD digipak, 12", and 12" remix. Both 12"s were also repackaged together as a limited edition presentation pack.

The song was featured in the PlayStation and Sega Saturn versions of video game Road Rash.

Track listing

Personnel 
 Andy Cairns – vocals, guitar
 Fyfe Ewing – vocals, drums
 Michael McKeegan – bass
 Harvey Birrell – producer
 Andrew Catlin – photography
 Jeremy Pearce – design

References 

1992 singles
Therapy? songs
1992 songs
A&M Records singles
Songs written by Andy Cairns
Songs written by Fyfe Ewing
Songs written by Michael McKeegan